Tolar is a city in Hood County, Texas, United States. Its population was 681 at the 2010 census. It is part of the Granbury, Texas micropolitan statistical area.

Geography

Tolar is located at  (32.390580, –97.919570).

Demographics

As of the census of 2000,504 people, 186 households, and 130 families were residing in the city. The population density was 553.2 people/sq mi mile (213.8/km). The 217 housing units averaged 238.2/sq mi (92.1/km). The racial makeup of the city was 93.65% White, 1.39% Native American, 0.40% Asian, 2.78% from other races, and 1.79% from two or more races. Hispanics or Latinos of any race were 5.16% of the population.

Of the 186 households, 35.5% had children under 18 living with them, 55.4% were married couples living together, 10.2% had a female householder with no husband present, and 30.1% were not families. About 28.0% of all households were made up of individuals, and 14.5% had someone living alone who was 65 or older. The average household size was 2.64, and the average family size was 3.20.

In the city, the age distribution was 27.4% under 18, 9.3% from 18 to 24, 26.0% from 25 to 44, 22.8% from 45 to 64, and 14.5% who were 65 or older. The median age was 36 years. For every 100 females, there were 90.9 males. For every 100 females age 18 and over, there were 81.2 males.

The median income for a household in the city was $39,167, and for a family was $45,357. Males had a median income of $32,313 versus $25,208 for females. The per capita income for the city was $17,093. About 7.0% of families and 9.7% of the population were below the poverty line, including 11.2% of those under age 18 and 21.7% of those age 65 or over.

Education
The City of Tolar is served by the Tolar Independent School District.

Gallery

References

External links
 City of Tolar, TX Official Website 
 Thumbnail sketch at dfwinfo.com

Cities in Hood County, Texas
Cities in Texas
Granbury micropolitan area